The Gipsy Hill is the second studio album  by the ska band Big D and the Kids Table. Released in 2002; there are two versions of the release: the EP version, and an LP version that adds the song "Apologies." The instrumental "Great Song" features, among other things, lines of dialog from the Vaughn Meader album The First Family

Track listing
 "Check List" - 2:25
 "Evil Girl/Angry Girl" - 3:00
 "Wailing Paddle" (The Rudiments) - 3:35
 "Great Song" - 3:25
 "Those Kids Suck" (T.K.S) - 1:20
 "Apologies" - 2:04 (On the LP version, not the EP version)
 "What the Hell Are You Going to Do?" - 0:12
 "Find Out (Damaged and Destroyed)" - 2:43
 "Scenester" - 4:30
 "The Difference" - 2:36
 "New England" (Jonathan Richman)- 3:37

Credits
Chris Bush — tenor saxophone
Paul Cuttler — Trombone
Steve Foote — bass
Paul Cuttler — Trombone
David McWane — vocals
Sean P. Rogan — guitar
Dan Stoppelman  — trumpet

2002 EPs
Big D and the Kids Table albums